Kottakarai is an Indian village in Villupuram district of Tamil Nadu. The village is called Kottakarai because kottai means palace in English. In this village there is a big lake. This village is located near to Auroville which is an international township city.

Villages in Viluppuram district